Hellinsia conyzae is a moth of the family Pterophoridae that is endemic to the Madagascar.

The larvae feed on Conyza lineariloba.

References

conyzae
Endemic fauna of Madagascar
Moths of Madagascar
Moths described in 1994